The 1948 County Championship was the 49th officially organised running of the County Championship, and ran from 8 May to 31 August 1948. Glamorgan County Cricket Club claimed their first title.

In August 1948, Glamorgan's match against Gloucestershire at Eugene Cross Park, play was stopped due to mountain mist around the ground and a flock of sheep.

Table

 12 points for a win
 6 points to each side in a match in which scores finish level
 4 points for first innings lead in a lost or drawn match
 2 points for tie on first innings in a lost or drawn match
 If no play possible on the first two days, the match played to one-day laws with 8 points for a win.

NOTES: Essex and Nottinghamshire totals include six points each for a drawn match that ended with scores equal (no allowance made in Championship scoring at this stage for the fact that Essex were still batting). Surrey total includes eight points for a win on first innings in a match reduced to one day.

Leading averages

Batting

Bowling

References

County Championship
County Championship seasons
Welsh cricket in the 20th century